The Secret History of Hacking is a 2001 documentary film that focuses on phreaking, computer hacking and social engineering occurring from the 1970s through to the 1990s. Archive footage concerning the subject matter and (computer generated) graphical imagery specifically created for the film are voiced over with narrative audio commentary, intermixed with commentary from people who in one way or another have been closely involved in these matters.

Film summary 
The film starts by reviewing the concept and the early days of phreaking, featuring anecdotes of phreaking experiences (often involving the use of a blue box) recounted by John Draper and Denny Teresi. By way of commentary from Steve Wozniak, the film progresses from phreaking to computer hobbyist hacking (including anecdotal experiences of the Homebrew Computer Club) on to computer security hacking, noting differences between these 2 forms of hacking in the process. The featured computer security hacking and social engineering stories and anecdotes predominantly concern experiences involving Kevin Mitnick. The film also deals with how society's (and notably law enforcement's) fear of hacking has increased over time due to media attention of hacking (by way of the film WarGames as well as journalistic reporting on actual hackers) combined with society's further increase in adoption of and subsequent reliance on computing and communication networks.

Cast 
John Draper, Steve Wozniak and Kevin Mitnick are prominently featured while the film additionally features comments from or else archive footage concerning Denny Teresi, Joybubbles, Mike Gorman, Ron Rosenbaum, Steven Levy, Paul Loser, Lee Felsenstein, Jim Warren, John Markoff, Jay Foster, FBI Special Agent Ken McGuire, Jonathan Littman, Michael Strickland and others.

See also
 List of films about computers

References

External links

Hacking (computer security)
Computing culture
Phreaking
Documentary films about the Internet
American documentary films
2001 documentary films
2001 films
Works about computer hacking
2000s English-language films
2000s American films